Zarichchia is a village in Nadvirna Raion of Ivano-Frankivsk Oblast of Ukraine. It belongs to Deliatyn settlement hromada, one of the hromadas of Ukraine.

Geography 

The village is located on a plain 8 km long and 1 to 4 km wide.

The Ivano-Frankivsk — Yabluniv highway passes through the village.

The village stretched for 4 km along the right bank of the Prut River. The  (2 m) is located on the Yasynovets stream, the right tributary of the Prut.

History 
Bronze Age burials have been discovered in the territory of Zarichchia.

It is mentioned on March 4, 1463 in the books of the Galician court. The village is mentioned in historical sources of the second half of the XVIII century.

Like all other Pokuttia villages, Zarzecze suffered from Tatar raids. In 1645-1650, the Delatyn land suffered from the war between the Bełżecki brothers.

The interwar period 
In the interwar period, there was a consumer cooperative in Zarzecze nad Prutem, which was a branch of the Delatyn cooperative. At that time, this cooperative branch had its own mill in the village.

There was a wooden parish church in Zarzecze nad Prutem, which was built in 1909, but burned down in 1916. So from that time until the mid-30s of the 20th century, there was a theological chapel in the village, which was consecrated in 1922. At that time, there were four roadside chapels in Zarzecze nad Prutem. In the 1930s, Fr. wing Antonii Dmytrash, city dean, councilor of the Episcopal Consistory.

In the 1930s, a systematic 4-grade Utraquist school worked in Zarzecze nad Prutem.

Second World War 

Starting in 1943, many Zarichchians joined the ranks of the UPA to fight against both the Wehrmacht and the Red Army.

In August 1943, the remnants of Sydir Kovpak's partisan unit, after being defeated by the SS detachment in Deliatyn, passed through the Zarichchia in the direction of the village of Bili Oslavy. The apartment of the inhabitant of the village AM Kovalchuk housed the headquarters of the connection. A fierce battle broke out outside the village in the Dilok tract, in which Major General Semyon Rudnev, the union's commissioner, was killed. Residents of the village DV Vatsyk, MY Kostytskyi, MS Humeniuk, I. Yu. Boicheniuk were the leaders of the Kovpakivtsi. During the passage of the front in the building of the village school was a hospital, here after a serious injury on August 31, 1944, died Hero of the Soviet Union, Lieutenant .

On February 17, 1944, the criminal elements of the village killed the village foreman Mykhailo Stelmashchuk, who ran away for fear of punishment, and therefore on February 28 the Gestapo shot 24 innocent people.

Soviet Era 
After World War II, the village was collectivized. The kolhosp (and then the radhosp) "Deliatinskyi" had 4,419 hectares of land, mills and a sawmill. The production direction was meat and dairy, there was also the cultivation of flax.

Independent Ukraine 
In the period from 1989, Zarichchians took an active part in the national revival that spread throughout Ukraine. In December 1989, a branch of the Ukrainian Language Society was established. The symbolic grave of the heroes of Ukraine was restored. The people of Zaricha poured it in the old place — on the "Grave" and consecrated it in May 1990. A lot of work was done to perpetuate the memory of the OUN-UPA.

In October 1992, a cross was erected and consecrated on the site of the Kernychky UPA base-village, and a commemorative sign dedicated to the 50th anniversary of the UPA was erected near the school. One of the streets of the village is named after Pavlo Vatsik (Major "Prut").

In 2000, a new school building was built, which was mainly financed by Anna-Liuba Yavorska, a citizen of Canada, a native of Zarichchia.

On January 21, 2022, a sports facility was opened in Zarichchia with the participation of the Governor of Ivano-Frankivsk Oblast Svitlana Onyshchuk, the head of the Ivano-Frankivsk Oblast Council Oleksandr Sych, People's Deputy of Ukraine Vasyl Virastiuk, representatives of the community and the clergy.

Russo-Ukrainian War 
After the start of the Russian invasion of Ukraine, on April 28, 2022, the executive committee of the Deliatyn settlement council decided to dismantle monuments-busts and memorial signs on the territory of the hromada, including the bust of the hero of the Soviet Union, commissar Semyon Rudnev in Zarichchia. On May 6, 2022, the bust of a member of the Soviet partisan movement, Semyon Rudnev, was dismantled near the building of the Zarichchia Starostyn district. Semyon Rudnev Street was also renamed to Stepan Bandera Street.

On December 18, 2022, in the area of the village of Klishchiivka, Bakhmut Raion, Donetsk Oblast, a fiance from Zarichchia Liubomyr Zhovnirovych died. The funeral took place on Christmas — December 25, symbolically, after the burial, two rainbows appeared in the sky at once, interrupting the light rain.

Culture 
The village has a lyceum named after Volodymyr Yavorskyi, a post office, a first-aid post, a house of culture, and a library. The village is fully gasified, there is street lighting. The Orthodox Church of Ukraine of the Holy Intercession, Father Mykhailo Kupchak, and the Greek Catholic Church, Father Mykhailo Smetaniuk, are registered in the village.

Demographics 
As of January 1, 1939, the village had 3,920 inhabitants, including 3,790 Ukrainian Greek Catholics, 80 Poles, and 50 Jews.

According to the 2001 census, the population of Zarichchia was 3,997 people.

Notable people 
 Pavlo Ivanovych Vatsyk — UPA major.
 Mykhailo Ivanovych Hnatiuk — Ukrainian philologist, historian and theoretician of literature, literary critic, Doctor of Philology, Chairman of the International Association of French Studies.
 Mykhailo Yuriiovych Kosylo — teacher, local historian, honored worker of education of Ukraine.
 Stepan Vasyliovych Mochernyi — economist, teacher, doctor of economics, professor.
 Dmytro Yakymishchak — teacher, lawyer, ambassador.

References

External links 
 Історичне Прикарпаття
 Заріччя на сайті Надвірнянської райради
 І. Косило, М. Косило. Заріччя: Історично-краєзнавча довідка
 «Моє Заріччя над Прутом» — Блог Михайла Клим'юка про Заріччя
 

Villages in Nadvirna Raion